Imāmah means "leadership" and is a concept in Twelver theology. The Twelve Imams are the spiritual and political successors to Muhammad, the Prophet of Islam, in the Twelver branch of Shia Islam. According to Twelver theology, the successors to Muhammad are infallible human beings, who rule justly over the community and maintain and interpret sharia and undertake the esoteric interpretation of the Quran. The words and deeds of Muhammad and the Imams guide the community. For this, the Imams must be free from error and sin and chosen by divine decree—nass—through the Prophet.

Shi'a believe that divine wisdom—'Aql—is the source of the souls of the Prophets and Imams and gives them esoteric knowledge—hikmah—and that their suffering is a means by which their devotees may acquire divine grace. The Imam is not the recipient of divine revelation, but has a close relationship with God, who guides him, allowing the Imam in turn to guide others. The Imamat, or belief in the divine guide, is a fundamental belief in Shia Islam and is based on the concept that God would not leave humanity without access to divine guidance.

According to the Twelvers, an Imam of the Age is always the divinely appointed authority on all matters of faith and law. Ali was the first Imam in this line and in the view of Twelvers the rightful successor to Muhammad, followed by the male descendants of Muhammad through his daughter Fatimah. Each Imam was the son of the previous Imam, with the exception of Husayn ibn Ali, who was the brother of Hasan ibn Ali. The twelfth and final Imam is Muhammad al-Mahdi, who is believed by the Twelvers to be alive and in hiding.

Imamah
According to al-Mofid and Allamah Hilli, Imamate is a universal authority over the religious and secular matters of the community as the successor of the prophet and in Shia theology it means the legitimate successor to the Islamic community who are just the family of the prophet (ahl al-Bayt). not because they are the prophet's family, but because they have the prerequisites of religious and political leadership. Allamah Tabatabaei states that Imamate is under investigation from three perspectives: Islamic government, Islamic sciences and spiritual guidance.The Motahhari states that the term Imamate reflects spiritual and sociopolitical leadership. Shia theology, philosophy and mysticism, politics as well as historical progression derives from the doctrine of Imamah.

Necessity
Two important functions of Muhammad were to reveal the divine law to humans and to guide them towards God. Twelver Shia believe that with the death of Muhammad, the first function, divine legislation, is completed, but that the second, guiding people and preserving and explaining the divine law, is continued through the Imams. Muhammad al-Baqir, the fifth Imam, explaining why the Imams are needed, states: "So that the world may remain in righteousness, thus Allah withholds chastisement from the world while a Prophet or Imam is upon it, for Allah has said 'Allah will not chastise them while you are among them' 8:33 and the Prophet had said ' the stars are safety for the people of the heaven and the members of my family are safety for the people of the earth. By members of my family is meant the Imams....Through them Allah gives sustenance (Rizq) to His servants and through them His lands prosper and the rain falls from the heaven and the earth gives out its blessings". The prophetic mission must be followed by a keeper of the Quran because it contains esoteric depth, superficial contradictions and hidden meaning. The meaning can be manifested not by ordinary knowledge, but by an inspired heir who is the Hujjah of Allah. Divine knowledge is attainable only through divine revelation or inspiration. While the prophet was a "legislative prophet" (nabi al-tashri), the continuation of the "esoteric prophecy" (nubuwah al-batiniyah) is through walayah. The role of the Imam in society is equivalent to the role of the mind in the body.

Theological aspect

The station of Imams
Before the creation of the world, from His own light, Allah derived a light called light of Nubuwwa (prophethood) or exoteric and from that derived another light called Walaya (Imamah) or esoteric. Allah said "Here is a Light from my Light, its trunk is the prophecy and its branch is the Imamate; prophecy belongs to Muhammad, my servant and messenger and Imamate belongs to Ali, my proof and my friend. Without them, I would have created none of my creation..." The very names of prophecy and Imamate are derived from the names of Allah. Allah has two kinds of attributes: Essence (Dhat) and Act (Fi'l); attributes of Essence exist in Allah Himself, not having its opposites, but attributes of the act, the Most Beautiful Names of Allah, are those which are manifested in His creatures, these creatures of manifestation of these attributes are Imams.Through these creatures, men could know His attributes.This is His plan to make Himself known. By verse 2:124, Shia believe that the position of Imamate is not higher than prophethood. Shia believe that Imam is God's Witness for the people, the Gate to God (bāb Allāh) and the Road (sabīl) and the Pillar of His Unity so he should be infallible and chosen by God. Allamah al-Majlisi, a Shia scholar of the Safawid era, states: "The Imams are superior to the prophets (except Muhammad) and the entire creation. The Covenant of the Imams was taken from the prophets, the angels and the entire creation. The major prophets called ulul-‘Azm (Nuh, Ibrahim, Musa and ‘Isa ) attained the status of ulul-‘Azm on account of loving the Imams." Muḥammad al-Bāqir narrates that God chose Ibraham first as a worshipper (ʿabd), then a prophet (nabī), then a messenger (rasūl), then a friend (khalīl) and finally as an Imam over the people. The Imams in many passages of Quran are referred as the Light of God (Nur), His Witnesses among mankind (Shuhada), His Signs (Ayat), those firm in the knowledge (Rasikhun), the vicegerents of God on earth (Khulafa), the gates through which he is approached (Abwab), the heirs of the knowledge of the prophet.The Imam is endowed with the holy spirit (Ruh al-Kuds). Shi'a Twelver believes that five Messengers achieved the rank of Leadership:Nuah, Ibrahim, Musa, Isa, Muhammad

Vicegerent (Khalifat Allah)
The Imam as vicegerent is the representative of all of God's attributes, whom he manifests. The Imam is God's image and face. It is the highest position for man that is mentioned, (2:30) which causes the angels to prostrate themselves before him (15:30). Khalifah is God's appointee (38:26). As God's best representative and sign, the vicegerent in the best way can contribute to God's goals. So every attribute which God owns by His Essence, the vicegerent also owns by accident. The vicegerent is the epiphany (mazhar) of God's divine names. In fact he is the soul of the universe which can cause ontological changes in it.

Mediator
Allamah al-Majlisi states that the Imams are mediators between God and humankind and that through their intercession, man can escape the punishment of the last day. In addition to Muhammad's role as intermediate between God and man, he is also a mediator before God on behalf of his followers. According to Shia belief, this idea of a religious mediator includes the Imams. Al-Shaykh al-Saduq has recorded a tradition that the prophet told Ali: "There are three things that I swear to be true. The first is that you and your descendants are mediators for mankind, as they will not be able to know Allah except through your introduction. The second is that you are to present to Allah those who may enter Paradise, i.e. those who recognize you and those whom you recognize. The third is that you are the absolute mediators, for those who will go to Hell will only be those who do not recognize you and whom you do not recognize." Al-Baqir said, "through us God is known and is worshiped by human kind...whoever calls Allah through our mediation is blessed". Without Imam, theophanic form (mazhar) and Face of Allah, no one can know Allah because through him, Allah manifests himself. Mulla Sadra explains that as the Imam is the perfect man—insan al-Kamel—is a higher-degree creature and the existence of the lower depends upon the higher degree, so the existence of the Imam is necessary.

Wali

Shia believe that the Divine Truth or the True Religion has two aspects: exoteric (zahir) and esoteric (batin). The exoteric side is revealed by the prophet and his Holy Book to the general people but the esoteric side is the mission of Imams and for the believers by the Esoteric interpretation of the Quran(Ta'wil). As the exoteric speaks of Shariah and esoteric speaks of Haqiqah, it is not a matter of succession but a matter of simultaneity. Haqiqah is based on the spiritual meaning of Quran. The kinship between the prophet and Imams is the sign of their walayah, not the basis for their walayah. According to Shia just those are the real faithful that "Allah has written faith upon their hearts" (58:22): only if Walayah is obtained the faith is perfect. Shia theologians refer to the verse 5:55 as a proof for the Walayah of Imams. According to Motahhari, Walayah has four dimensions: the right of love, loving the Ahl al-Bayt is obligatory for all Muslims, the authority of Alh al-Bayt in spiritual guidance, the authority of Ahl al-Bayt in socio-political guidance and the authority of the universal nature by the grace of Allah. By Shia, in fact, a guardian must protect the religion against any additions or subtractions after the prophet. According to al-Baqir, the prophet has revealed the religion but in every age there must be an Imam who leads to the religion and verse 13:7 refers to Imam. A hadith narrates that "He who knows himself knows his Lord.", but knowing Allah without His theophanic form (Mazhar), the Face of Allah, is impossible. Imam is the one who carries the human knowledge of Allah, without him we will be trapped in ta'til or metaphysical idolatry (tashbih)." Numerous Shia hadith narrate: The Quran is the silent Imam, the Imam is the speaking Quran; Imam is the Guide by whom Quran remains alive. Regarding this matter, Mulla Sadra believes that the earth can not be without an Imam otherwise, the Quran will die. By Shia, Wali is the one who has the most love and devotion to God, so God has bestowed His knowledge upon him.

Hujjah

The Hujja means the proof or God's guarantee to men; as the presence of the Hujja, whether hidden or apparent, is necessary for all times, this presence expresses the metaphysical reality of the Hujja and the inseparability of the prophetology from Imamology. Al-Baqir stated, "...Imam is the Proof of Allah to His servants and the earth will not remain without the Proof of Allah to His servants". From the Time of Adam, Allah has sent Imams to guide the people towards Him who are His Hujjah upon His worshippers. Khomeni described "Proof of Allah" as follows: "A ‘Proof of Allah’ is one whom Allah has designated to
conduct affairs, all his deeds, actions and sayings constitute a proof for the Muslims. If someone commits an offense, will be made to the ‘proof’ for adducing evidence and formulating the charge. If the ‘proof’ commands you to perform a certain act, to implement the penal provisions of the law in a certain way, or to spend the income derived from booty,
zakat and sadaqa in a certain manner and if you fail to obey him in any of these respects, then God Almighty will advance a ‘proof’ against you on the day of Judgment".

Political aspect
The Shia believe that only the divinely chosen one is the legitimate leader of the community who owns some spiritual gifts. The first of these leaders was Ali ibn Abi Talib and his successors were the descendants of the prophet and the heirs of the charisma of Ali. Imams possess all the attributes, duties, authorities of the prophet except receiving revelation. They are the political and religious guardians over the community. Although Imam has a political role, his Imamah does not depend on this role. According to verse 5:55, because absolute authority belongs to Allah, He can grant this authority to whomever He wishes as Guardians. Muhammad Baqir al-Sadr stated that the political and spiritual dimensions are inseparable.

Necessary attributes of Imams
According to Shia theology, Imam must display three attributes: divine appointment (nass), wisdom (hikmah), superiority (afdaliyyah). This right to authority is derived from the prophet and Quran and thereby Allah.

Nass (divine designation)
One of the fundamental principles of Shia is that Imam is designated by the prophet and every Imam nominates his successor by divine designation (nass). The divine designation is a logical necessity because Imam must be infallible and as this is a hidden virtue, known only to Allah. Thus this designation is expressed to the people only by an infallible: the previous Prophet or Imam. Al-Baqir stated that the prophet was commanded by Allah, before his death, to grant to Ali his knowledge, his faith and the Great Name (al-Ism al-A'zam), as well as the legacy of knowledge and prophethood so that the Divine Heritage would be continued through the prophet's progeny. So one of the fundamentals in the principle of Imamate was nass al-Jali (explicit designation) which was hereditary. Shia Muslims believe that Allah appointed leaders for those who practice the religion of Allah. When the prophet had taught the people the religion, he would then appoint a leader, in accordance with the orders of Allah, to guide believers towards perfection. Imamate is a universal authority and this right is derived from (niyabah) the prophet. Allamah Majlesi stated that from the time of Adam, every prophet had a successor. Imam like the prophet had a perfect authority over the Muslim community including matters of religion and government. As the prophet is the representative of Allah, his successor is also a representative of Allah. If he is to represent Allah, he must be appointed by Allah. Imam can not be distinguished except by designation. Following verse 2:124 of Quran, Shia believe that Imamah is something that is given by Allah and must be appointed by Him. The earth never can be without a true Imam. The relation between Imams is spiritual, carrying the Muhammadan Light from one Imam to the other. The Shia idea that the succession should continue in the descendants of the prophet originates from the Quran as verse 4:54.

Ismah

Shia believe that Ismah is a logical prerequisite of Imamah as Allah has made their obedience necessary and the verse 33:33 proves Ismah of the fourteen infallible. Ismah in addition to sinlessness means infallibility, without error. Imam by virtue of Nass based on Hikmah (wisdom) and Nur (light) becomes Ma'sum (Infallible).

Hikmah (wisdom)
The Imam has a perfect knowledge about religion and mankind. The Imams are the most knowledgeable in religious law and the rewards and punishments of the next world. They understand the literal meaning and the internal meaning (Ta'wil) of the Quran. Some Hadiths state the link between Allah and the Imams is a pillar descending from the heaven. The sources of the knowledge of Imam are the transmission from the previous Imam, inherited knowledge, acquired through angels and acquired from books whose contents are known only to the Imams. According to some Hadiths, Imams possess several special books including Al-Jafr (The Divination), Al-Sahifa (The Book), Al-Jamia (The Compilation), Book of Fatimah and a codex of Quran and its commentary (Mus'haf of Ali) written by Ali. He has the knowledge of the Greatest Name of Allah. As Imams are the manifestation of the attributes of act (fi'l) of Allah, their Knowledge is equivalent to the Knowledge of Allah. Imams have all the revealed books of the prophets. As Sayyid Haydar Amuli states: "All the Imams are one and the same Light (nur), one and the same Essence (haqiqah), exemplified in twelve persons." The hereditary character of nass embodied in itself a kind of exclusive Hikmah for its recipient which was traced back to Ali of whom the prophet told "I am the city of knowledge and Ali is its gate". Ibn Babaway states that "the title Amir al-Momenin reserved for Imam indicates that he is the storehouse (mirror) of knowledge (mira't al-ilm) from whom people derived knowledge but he did not derive knowledge from anyone else." Only Imam has knowledge of Unseen (Ilm al-Qayb) and fully understands Quran and worldly matters, a knowledge that he received from Allah through Muhammad. Only Quran and Imam can truly manifest the Divine Truth.

Afdaliyyah (superiority)
As the Imam is infallible (masum), he is the best of his age, otherwise, Allah would choose another. Ontologically the fourteen infallibles are superior to prophets, since they are created from a nobler matter. In Quran, with respect to kingship (Imamate) and wisdom (hikmah, book), the heirs of the prophets are their descendants and kin. Al-Baqir states that Imamate is among the progeny of Imams as indicated in verse 33:6 which its interpretation refers to the descendants of Husayn ibn Ali. He added that the light that is mentioned in verse 64:8 refers to Imams who are the light of Allah, this spiritual light which passes from the prophet to Imams is the symbol of eternal knowledge (hikmah). Referring to the light, he stated," the first beings that Allah created were Mohammad and his family, the rightly guided ones and the guides, they were the phantoms of light before Allah". Personal qualities are known only through Quran or hadith. Although Imamate is not hereditary, Shia believe that Imamate are among the progeny of Muhammad.

The necessity of recognizing Imams
According to Ja'far al-Sadiq: " We are the ones to whom Allah has made obedience obligatory. The people will not prosper unless they recognize us and the people will not be excused if they are ignorant of us. He who has recognised us is a believer (Momin) and he who has denied us is an unbeliever (Kafir)"... Al-Riza remarks that "....whoever tends not to be separated from Allah, he love the household of Mohammad ...and follow his Imam, whoever does this is under the mercy of Allah..." Kulaini, Na'mani attributed a tradition to al-Baqir that those who worship Allah without recognizing his righteous Imam are not accepted.

The necessity of obeying Imams
If the Imamate of Imams is not affirmed, one can not enter into heaven. Al-Baqir states that according to verse 42:23, the believers must both obey and love the Imams. Shia believe that Imamah is inseparable from Wilayah, which involves loving ahl al-Bayt (Imams), obeying them in their commands and prohibitions, recognising their rights and believing in their Imamat and that this is one of the five principles (usul) of Shia. According to al-Khu'i: "the wilayat and imamate in the meaning of succession (khilafat) is an essential part (dharuriy) of Shi'ism; anyone who rejects this dimension of the wilayat would not be considered as a Shia". Muhammad Baqir Majlisi states: "All the Imamis agree that the spiritual validity of deeds and Allah's approval of them are conditioned by faith (Imam); this point is as integral a part of faith as is love for the Twelve Imams and their imamate." Sajjad, the fourth Imam, states that the religion is attained only through submission and whoever submits to  the Imams is guided and blissful. Obeying the Imams is obligatory because Allah has thus commanded.

Guidance is only through Imams
According to Tabatabaei (21:73, 32:24) the word guidance is used side by side by the word Imamah and is followed by "our command", a kind of guidance with a divine command that conveys humankind to the final truth, not just showing the way. According to Mesbahyazdi, while Allah is the Creator, all praise is due to Him and He is the only ontological (takwini) and legislative (tashri'e) Lord. So everyone who wishes to be a servant and a monotheist should accept His legislative laws and accept the executer of His laws, because this is His Will (Iradah). A mutawatir hadith narrates that loving the prophet's family (Ahl al-Bayt) is the sign of faith and enmity towards them is the sign of hypocrisy. According to Mottahari, everyone who does not accept walayah, he is in enmity with walayah which causes his deeds to be worthless (6:88, 18:105, 14:18,3:117, 25:23), because he is not humble before the Truth which is the basis of a pure deed. Many hadith introduce Imam as the Guide because there is no knowledge of Allah accessible to man without the knowledge of Imam. Through hadiths, in order to reach to Allah, man must pass the Path (Sirat) who are the Imams.

Imamate and revelation (Wahy)
As Muhammad was the last person to receive revelation, the Imams receive divine inspiration (elham) and, as such, are in contact with the holy source of knowledge. A hadith narrates that "Imam hears the voice of the Angel, but does not have his vision, either in sleep or in waking". Imams get Revelation but not like the prophets. They are called Muhaddatht and are spoken to by angels via sounds through their ears and are supported by the Holy Spirit. They receive additional information on the Night of Power Laylat al-Qadr. They make Spiritual Ascension to the Divine Throne on Friday to add their knowledge. Regarding this matter, Shaykh al-Muzaffar explains: "We maintain that the powers of the Imams to receive inspiration have reached the highest degree of excellence and we say that it is a Divinely given power. By this means the Imam is able to understand information about anything, anywhere and at any time and he understands by means of this Divinely-given power at once, without recourse to methodological reasoning or guidance from a teacher. When he desires to know about some matter, it is reflected in his pure mind as if in a polished mirror. It is clear from the histories
of their lives that like the Prophet, the Imams were not trained or taught by anyone at all, not even in reading and writing, from their childhoods to the maturing of their minds. No author or teacher was seen to instruct one of them, but they were incomparable masters of knowledge so that they never asked
about any problem without being able to answer it immediately and they never said that they did not know. They never required time to consider a question before replying."

Arguments

Shia view of Quran
Shias claim the verse of Light (24:35) is attributed to The Fourteen Infallible. According to Shia sources on the nature and basis of Imamate, H al-Baqir emphasizes that verse 5:55 refers to Ali. According to al-Baqir's interpretation of verse 35:32, Imams are "Then we caused to inherit the Book those We have chosen of Our servants". Shias mind verse 4:59, which signifies a perfect love and obedience to divine guides.

Other Shia sources claim that Imams are expressed in Quran as: "the Supreme Sign" (al-Ayat al-Kobra) (79:20), "the August Symbol" (al-Mathal al-a'la) (16:60), "the Most Solid Handle" (al-Urwat al-Wuthqa) (2:256), (31:22). According to al-Baqir Imams are the Light of Allah (64:8, 57:28). These verses (28:68, 2:30, 38:26, 2:124, 21:73) state that Imamate is a divine appointment and a fallible person can not be an Imam. Madelung, regarding the blood ties which is found in Quran, states the superiority of Ali for his succession. Regarding verse 2:124, Tabatabaei states that Imamah is a divine status, Imam must be Ma'sum (infallible), the earth can not be without an Imam, Imam have the complete knowledge which is related to this world and the next of the people, Imam excels all people in all virtues. However it is argued by many scholars that the 12 Shia Imams have not been mentioned in the Quran and the Shia doctrine of Imamah is based heavily on interpretation based on weak hadiths.

By Hadith

In Ghadir Khum, when Ali was appointed Imamate, verse 5:3 was revealed, which expresses that the religion had become perfect because of the appointment of Ali to Imamate. and obedience to him had become obligatory upon Muslims. Hadith of Two Weighty Things reflects the proximity of the Imams to the Quran. Addressing Hussain, the prophet said:" you are Imam, the son of the Imam, the brother of the Imam, nine of your lineal descendants will be pious Imams, the ninth of them being their Qa'im. The Shia scholar 'Allamah Kashif al-Ghita said about the Imamah: "Imamah is a divine station, just like Nubuwwah. Just as Allah chooses whomsoever He wants to for Nubuwwah and Risalah … similarly, for Imamah, too, He selects whomsoever He wishes."

By reason
Al-Baqir states that while people need a guide for their journey to a strange place, their journey to heaven is stranger and more in need of a guide. Al-Mufid states that an Imam is necessary for defining the exact laws that are obligatory upon the Muslims. Many verses in Quran are ambiguous, revelation of Quran without further explanation is unlikely from Allah. While Imamate brings the people nearer to obedience and away from disobedience, it is Grace (Lutf) that is incumbent of Allah. Regarding rejecting the Imamah-doctrine, writes: "Imamah is a universal grace (lutf ‘amm) while Nubuwwah (prophethood) is a special grace (lutf khass), it is possible that a specific period in time can be void of a living Nabi while the same is not true for the Imam. To reject universal grace is worse than to reject any special grace. The prophet founded an eternal Shari'ah for all the times and this eternal religion could not continue without a leader.

History
In the period of Minor Occultation, theologians like Ibn Qube Razi, Newbakhtis, al-Shaykh al-Mufid, Seyyed Morteza and al-Shaykh al-Tusi rebuild the theological school of Imamiyah. In the second and third century of Hijra, a Ma'sum (infallible) and divinely chosen leader of the religion was more focused than the political role of the Imams by the theologians. Although Imamiyah believed that most of the works on the early Islamic centuries argue that Shi'ism began as a political movement rather than a religious group. However this does not mean that religious sentiments were absent in the first century.
Dakake believes that the doctrine of Imamate was established in the time of Ja'far al-Sadiq, while Kohlberg states that the Twelver Shi'ism dates back not much before the beginning of the "Major_Occultation".

Muhammad is reported to have said that the Islamic leadership is in Koreish (i.e., his tribe) and that 12 “Imams” shall succeed him. Sunni and Shiite sects differ as to whom Muhammad was referring. Muhammad stated (authenticated by Sunnis and Shiites), that “Whoever does not know the Imam of his Lifetime (Hadith of the Current Imam: i.e., recognizes same) has died the death of Ignorance”. The idea of a prophet appointing a successor is found in the Old Testament where Joshua son of Nun is declared Moses’ successor or manager of his affairs after his death.
				
Before conception, the preceding the Imam is sent through a heavenly syrup which he drinks. 
The Imam is born pure and circumcised. (93:5)
The Imam's mother experiences light and noises before the birth of the Imam. 
 
Shias believe that just as Moses appointed Aaron as his successor on Bani-Israel, (Hadith of position), in accordance with God's order, Muhammad, the final prophet, appointed Ali ibn Abi Talib to be the leader of the believers.

The Shi'a Twelver denomination of Islam consider it to be the highest level of responsibility given by God to a human.

List of the Twelve Imams
Ali ibn Abi Talib
Hasan ibn Ali 
Husayn ibn Ali 
Ali ibn Husayn 
Muhammad al-Baqir 
Jafar al-Sadiq 
Musa al-Kadhim 
Ali al-Rida 
Muhammad al-Taqi 
Ali al-Hadi 
Hasan al-Askari 
Muhammad al-Mahdi

See also 
 Sayyid imam Muhammad al-Askari al-Baaj Saba' al-dujail
Hadith of Mubahela
Hadith of position
Hadith of The Cloak - Hadith Al Kisa

Hadith of the pond of Khumm
Hadith of the Twelve Successors
Islamic leadership
Theology of Twelvers
Signs of the reappearance of Muhammad al-Mahdi
Reappearance of Muhammad al-Mahdi

Notes

Footnotes

References

External links
Shi'ite Doctorine by MOHAMMAD ALI AMIR-MOEZZI an article in Encyclopædia Iranica
Imamah in the Qur'an
Hujjat by Maria Dakake an article in Encyclopædia Iranica
A brief introduction of Twelve Imams
A Brief History Of The Lives Of The Twelve Imams a chapter of Shi'a Islam (book) by Allameh Tabatabaei
 The Twelve Imams Taken From "A Shi'ite Anthology" By Allameh Tabatabaei
 A Short History of the Lives of The Twelve Imams
The Shi'a concept of Imamate
Imamat vs. Prophethood (Part II)

Twelver theology
Islamic terminology